Api-Api is a state constituency in Sabah, Malaysia, that is represented in the Sabah State Legislative Assembly. The representative elected in 2018 is Christina Liew.

History

Polling districts 
As at 12 February 2016, this constituency contains the polling districts of Kampong Ayer, Jalan Istana, Jalan Kebajikan, Sunny Garden and Jalan Bandaran.

Election results

References 

Sabah state constituencies